Lawn bowls women's pairs at the 2018 Commonwealth Games was held at the Broadbeach Bowls Club in the Gold Coast, Australia, from April 9 to 13. A total of 42 athletes from 21 associations participated in the event.

Sectional play
The top two from each section advance to the knockout stage.

Section A

Section B

Section C

Section D

Knockout stage

External links
Results

References

Women's pairs
Comm